The RATP Group, also known as the RATP or Régie autonome des transports parisiens, is a state-owned public transport operator and maintainer headquartered in Paris, France. Formed in 1949, it has its origins as the city's public transport operator. Its logo represents, in a stylised version, the Seine's meandering through the Paris area as the face of a person looking up.

Today, the RATP is still responsible for most of the public transport in the Greater Paris area, including the Paris Métro, Île-de-France tram, and RATP bus network, as well as part of the regional express rail (RER) network. In the Île-de-France region, the RATP carries about 3.3 billion passengers per year.

While RATP's Paris-related activities are still a major part of its business, its operations have extended since 2002 to include business around the globe in various modes of urban and regional transportation. RATP Dev, the Group's international operations and maintenance subsidiary, is present in 16 countries in Africa, Asia, Australia, Europe and North America.

In 2019, the Group's consolidated revenue was €5.704 billion; it employs 64,000 people. The company describes itself as the fourth-largest actor in public transport.

History

The RATP was created on 1 January 1949 by combining the assets of the Compagnie du chemin de fer métropolitain de Paris (CMP), which operated the Paris Métro, and the Société des transports en commun de la région parisienne (STCRP), which operated the city's bus system.

Earlier, the CMP had absorbed the Nord-Sud Company in 1930 and the Ligne de Sceaux in 1937, which extended commuter rail to the suburbs. The STCRP had been created on 1 January 1921 by the merger of about half a dozen independent bus and streetcar operators in the Paris area.  By the time the STCRP was merged into the RATP, all of its streetcars had been replaced by bus routes.

In the early years of the 21st century, a partnership with the Transdev group resulted in RATP acquiring a minority shareholding in that group, with its many worldwide transport operations. However, in 2009, the Caisse des dépôts et consignations, the majority owner of the Transdev group, started negotiations with Veolia Environnement to merge Transdev with Veolia Transport. As part of the resulting agreement, made in May 2010, it was agreed that the RATP Group would take over ownership of some of Transdev's operations in lieu of cash payment for its holdings in Transdev. This had a considerable impact on RATP's international profile.

In 2009, RATP entered the United States by purchasing transit contractor McDonald Transit Associates. McDonald operated Fort Worth Transportation Authority (now Trinity Metro) in Texas, Votran in Florida, and Waco Transit System in Texas, among others.

On 1 August 2011, the RATP Group purchased Stagecoach Metrolink's contract to operate the Metrolink light rail system in Greater Manchester, England until July 2017. Two years later, in 2013, RATP purchased the nearby long-established coach company, Selwyns Travel, a National Express operator.

RATP started testing EasyMile EZ10 shuttles on regular roads (with an employee on board) in January 2021, taking passengers to Bois de Vincennes on weekends.

Presidents 

The current president and CEO of the RATP, Jean Castex, is in office since 28 November 2022.

Operations in Paris

In Paris, RATP operates, under its own name, on behalf of and under contract with Île-de-France Mobilités (IDFM), the Paris region transit authority. RATP's services constitute, in their own right, a multi-mode public transportation infrastructure, but also contribute to a larger multi-mode system extending out into the surrounding Île-de-France communities.

RATP's services in the Greater Paris area include:
The Paris Métro, a system of mostly underground rapid transit lines which run throughout the city, with some lines extending somewhat beyond the city boundaries. Two metro lines are fully automated and driverless: line 1 (since 2012) and line 14 (since its opening in 1998). Line 4 is currently in the process of being converted into a fully automated and driverless line as well, which is expected to be completed later in 2023.
Orlyval, the automated metro shuttle connecting Antony station (RER B) and Orly Airport.
Parts of the RER, the Paris regional express rail network that runs mostly underground in the centre of Paris and overground in the rest of the region. The rest of the RER network is operated by SNCF.
Eight out of twelve lines of the Paris tram system (T1, T2, T3a, T3b, T5, T6, T7, T8) totalizing  and 183 stops.
 Future Île-de-France tramway Line 10 ( and 13 stops).
The extensive Paris city bus system (351 lines with a total length of ), including the night buses of the Noctilien network.
Two BRT lines: the Trans-Val-de-Marne (TVM) and line 393.
The Montmartre funicular.

Paris bus route 341 was RATP's first line equipped with 100% electric full-size buses (starting June 2016). By early 2021, there were over 150 full battery electric buses in the fleet with a target of 1,500 by 2025.

Operations outside Paris
RATP Dev is present in France as well as in 15 other countries, namely Algeria, Australia, Belgium, Egypt, Hong Kong SAR of China, Italy, Morocco, the Philippines, Qatar, Saudi Arabia, Serbia, South Africa, Switzerland, the United Kingdom, and the United States. Wholly and partly owned operations include the following:

Operations in France

Heavy rail
Future CDG Express, express rail link between Paris Gare de l'Est and Charles de Gaulle Airport (in the Hello Paris joint venture with Keolis)

Other modes
Agglobus, the urban bus network of Bourges in the Cher department (since 2011, renewed for the 2017-2022 period, and again renewed for the 2023-2030 period)
ALPBUS, operating various school, shuttle and coach services as well as fixed routes services including, among others, the bus network serving Cluses and cross-border services between France and Switzerland with routes connecting Annecy, Thonon-les-Bains and Sallanches with Geneva Airport
The Bibus multimodal network in and around Brest including the Brest tramway and Brest cable car, in the Finistère department (for the 2019-2027 period)
Cars Jacquemard, a coach operator in the Eure department
Cars Perrier, one of the operators of the Sqybus network serving the Saint-Quentin-en-Yvelines suburb near Paris
The CTRL network of Lorient Agglomération in the Morbihan department (for the 2018-2022 period)
Com'Bus, Yvelines and Val-d'Oise departments
The Impulsyon urban bus network of La Roche-sur-Yon in the Vendée department (since 2010, renewed for the 2017-2023 period)
The Irigo multimodal in and around Angers including the Angers tramway (for the 2019-2025 period)
The Kicéo urban bus network of Vannes in the Morbihan department (for the 2017-2023 period)
Lignes de Vienne et agglomération (L'va) in and around Vienne in the Isère department (since 2011)
Le Vib in Vierzon in the Cher department (since 2011, renewed in 2015 for 8 more years)
The Marinéo urban bus network of Boulogne-sur-Mer in the Pas-de-Calais department (since 2013, renewed in 2021 for another 6 years)
Mouvéo, the urban bus network of Épernay in the Marne department (since 2016)
Ondéa, the urban bus network of Aix-les-Bains and its surroundings in the Savoie department (since 2014, renewed in 2021 for another 7 years)
Bus network serving the Western area of the "Grand Paris Seine et Oise" and "Portes de l’Île-de-France" communities in the Yvelines department (64 fixed route lines including two express coach routes using the A14 motorway, two night lines and on-demand transport, for the 2021-2029 period)
PAM 91, paratransit in the Essonne department (since 2011, renewed for the 2017-2022 period)
PAM 92, 93 and 95, paratransit in the Hauts-de-Seine, Seine-Saint-Denis and Val-d'Oise departments (Greater Paris area)
TAAM, paratransit in and around Amiens in the Somme department (since 2021)
The STIVO urban bus network in Cergy-Pontoise
Transports annemassiens collectifs (TAC), urban bus network covering the Agglomeration community of Annemasse – Les Voirons (joint control with TPG)
Transports de l'agglomération de Charleville-Mézières (TAC), urban bus network of Charleville-Mézières and Sedan in the Ardennes department (since 2012, renewed for the 2017–2024 period)
TBK bus and coach network covering Quimperlé and surroundings in the Finistère department (for the 2020-2028 period)
Transports urbains laonnois (TUL), the urban bus network of Laon in the Aisne department (for the 2016-2022 period)
The Transvilles multimodal network in and around Valenciennes, including the Valenciennes tramway (since 2015)

Operations outside France

Heavy rail 

Gautrain, regional express train in Gauteng province, South Africa, linking Johannesburg, Pretoria and O. R. Tambo International Airport (since 2010)
"La Ferroviaria Italiana", two regional rail lines in Tuscany, Italy (minority share)
Cairo-New Cario railway, regional rail service between Cairo and the new administrative capital of Egypt (since 2022)

Metro and tramway 

Tramway networks in the Algerian cities of Algiers (since 2012), Oran (since 2013), Constantine (since 2013), Sidi Bel Abbès (since 2017), Ouargla (since 2018) and Sétif (since 2018)
Future Sydney Metro Western Sydney Airport, Australia (15 years of operations and maintenance starting 2026)
Cairo Metro Line 3, Cairo, Egypt (for the 2020-2035 period)
DC Streetcar, Washington, D.C., United States (since 2016)
Florence tramway, Florence, Italy (since 2010)
Casablanca LRT, Casablanca, Morocco (since 2012, contract renewed in 2017 until the end of 2029)
Hong Kong Tramways, Hong Kong (since 2009)
Manila Line 1, Manila, Philippines (technical assistance, since 2014)
MATA Trolley, Memphis, Tennessee, United States (since 2021)
Sun Link Streetcar, Tucson, Arizona, United States (since 2013, renewed in 2019)
Doha Metro and Lusail LRT, Qatar (20-year contract through RKH Qitarat, joint venture formed by Hamad Group (51%) and Keolis-RATP Dev (49%))
Future Riyadh Metro Lines 1 and 2 (12-year contract)

Bus and coach

Italy 
Tuscany regional bus network including 4,800 employees, 2,700 vehicles and 57 depots, via the Autolinee Toscane subsidiary (since 1 November 2021, for a duration of 11 years)
Cilia Italia, Lazio

United Kingdom 

RATP Dev's presence in the United Kingdom is mainly concentrated in London with its portfolio of bus services on behalf of Transport for London. Through its three subsidiaries London United, Quality Line (acquired as Epsom Coaches in April 2012) and London Sovereign (acquired in April 2014), RATP Dev manages 1129 vehicles on 96 routes out of 10 garages, and has 3387 employees, as of 2020. Early 2021, RATP Dev announced that it is to close its Quality Line subsidiary and Epsom depot. The closure was effective as of July 2021.

On 16 June 2021, the firm announced it had placed an order for 195 electric buses for its London operations to be delivered jointly by Alexander Dennis and BYD Auto, the by then largest ever full battery electric bus order in the UK.

On 22 September 2021, RATP Dev and SeaLink Travel Group (now Kelsian Group) announced that their respective West London bus operations (including London United, London Sovereign and Tower Transit's Westbourne Park garage) would merge into a new joint venture called RATP Dev Transit London, with RATP Dev holding 87.5% of shares and SeaLink 12.5%. The incorporation of the joint venture was finalised on 11 December 2021. Tower Transit's Lea Interchange garage, located in East London, was not part of the joint venture and remained unaffected until sold off separately to Stagecoach London.

Outside of London, RATP Dev manages, since 2011, the Air Decker, a bus service operated by Bath Bus Company connecting Bristol Airport with Bath.

United States  

RATP operates various transit systems in the United States under the name RATP Dev USA:

Arlington Entertainment Area Management District Trolley, Arlington, Texas
Asheville Rides Transit (ART), North Carolina (since 2017)
Augusta, Georgia (since 2013)
Bloomington Transit, Indiana
Bowling Green, Kentucky (since 2020)
Mountain Mobility, Buncombe County, North Carolina (paratransit, since 2011, renewed in 2020)
Charlotte Area Transit System, North Carolina (bus only)
Citibus, Lubbock, Texas
Citylink Edmond, Oklahoma (since 2014)
City of Ocala SunTran, Marion County, Florida
The COMET, South Carolina (since 2020)
 Hartford, New Haven, and Stamford Divisions of CTtransit, Connecticut (management contract since 2023)
 DC Circulator, Washington, D.C. (six routes and 72 vehicles, since 2018)
 Greensboro Transit Authority, Greensboro, North Carolina (since 2022)
IndyGo, Indianapolis, Indiana (paratransit only, since 2021)
LakeXpress, Lake County, Florida (seven fixed routes, paratransit and 54 vehicles, management contract since 2017)
Lextran Wheels Paratransit, Lexington, Kentucky (since 2022)
Memphis Area Transit Authority, Memphis, Tennessee (since 2021)
Needles Area Transit, California
Roadrunner, California, U.S. (fixed routes, paratransit, charter and black car services, >200 vehicles, acquired in 2018)
Camarillo Area Transit
City of Lompoc Transit
VCTC Intercity
Santa Maria Area Transit (SMAT), Santa Maria, California, U.S. (management contract since 2018)
THE Bus, Hernando County, Florida
TheBus, Prince George's County, Maryland (since 2020)
Trinity Metro, Texas
Waco Transit System, Texas
Yuma County Area Transit, Arizona (fixed routes and paratransit, since 2018)
 Zion National Park, Utah, shuttle system (since 2000, renewed in 2020)

Saudi Arabia  
Riyadh (since 2014 set-up of the capital's future urban bus network with approximately 1,000 vehicles over three depots, and operations and maintenance for a duration of 10 years starting 2016, 20% share of a consortium with SAPTCO)

Switzerland  
 HelveCié, operating various school, shuttle and coach services in the cantons of Fribourg, Geneva, Neuchâtel and Vaud
 Various bus and coach services as subcontractor to Geneva's transit operator TPG
 Cross-border services between Switzerland and France including services connecting Annecy, Thonon-les-Bains et de Sallanches with Geneva Airport

Tootbus 
RATP Dev manages touristic hop on hop off tour operations using double-decker buses: 
 in Paris (formerly "Paris L'OpenTour"), 
 Tootbus London (formerly The Original Tour, acquired in September 2014), 
 Tootbus operated by Bath Bus Company in Bath, Cardiff, Eastbourne and Windsor
 in Brussels, Belgium (since November 2021 with up to 12 fully battery-electric vehicles, as part of an eight-year concession granted by STIB).

Other 
"Slide Ealing" is a ride sharing minibus service (microtransit) launched 12 November 2019 in London, in partnership with MOIA.

Since 2013, RATP Dev, in a consortium with TPG and Pomagalski, manages the Salève cable car, in the French Alps. Ridership of the cable car has increased by 50% since 2013, notably after the introduction of shuttle buses from Annemasse and Saint-Julien-en-Genevois. The contract of the RATP Dev-led consortium has been renewed in 2019 for 12 additional years, until 2031.

RATP Dev established in 2018 a "regional office" in Singapore for Asia-Pacific albeit not having any operational activity in the city-state. In December 2020, RATP Dev and SBS Transit announced a partnership for future rail projects in Singapore, without referencing specific commercial targets.

In September 2020, RATP Dev announces a partnership with Getlink to jointly bid under the "Régionéo" brand name for regional rail services in France which will gradually opened to competitive tendering. Régionéo is bidding for tenders in the Grand Est region in a consortium with Meridiam and Colas and has also expressed interest in tenders in the Hauts-de-France region.

Former operations
(selection / non comprehensive list)
Algiers Metro (from 1 November 2011 to 31 October 2020)
São Paulo Metro Line 4: technical assistance for start-up and the launch of commercial operations in 2010 and 1% share in the concessionnaire ViaQuatro until 2015
Rio de Janeiro Light Rail: technical assistance for start-up and the launch of commercial operations in 2016
Anqing Zhongbei buses in Anqing, China (as part of RDTA from 2008 to ?)
Shenyang trams (as part of RDTA from 2013 to ?)
Line 9 of the Seoul Metropolitan Subway (as part of RDTA from 2009 to 2019)
Line 1 of the Mumbai Metro (as part of RDTA from 2014 to 2019)
Aléo, the urban bus network of Moulins in the Allier department (from 2012 to 2019)
STI Allier et STI Nièvre, France (ceased to Prêt à Partir in 2018)
Manchester Metrolink (from August 2011 to July 2017)
Selwyns Travel: coach operator with 92 vehicles based in Manchester, Runcorn and St Helens, England (acquired in 2013 and sold in 2020).
"Slide", an on-demand shared transport / microtransit service targeting commuters in Bristol, England (from July 2016 to December 2018, in partnership with French start-up Padam)
Yellow Buses, a bus operator in Bournemouth, England (from 2011 to July 2019).
Fullington Auto Bus Company, State College, Pennsylvania, U.S.: acquired in 2009 and sold in 2017
Open Loop New York: hop on hop off tour company in New York City commenced in May 2014, ceded to Big Bus Tours in 2017
Capital MetroBus in Austin, Texas: 79 routes, 250 buses, 21 million passengers/year, from 2012 to early 2020.
Votran in Volusia County, Florida (until 2020)
Mountain Metropolitan Transit, Colorado Springs, Colorado (until early 2023)

References

External links

 – official site
 – official site
Paris tourist information
Tram Travels: Régie Autonome des Transports Parisiens (RATP)

 
Public transport operators in France
Transport in Paris
Transport in Île-de-France
Government-owned companies of France
Companies based in Paris
Transport companies established in 1948
1948 establishments in France
Transit authorities with electric buses